The list of ship launches in 1714 includes a chronological list of some ships launched in 1714.


References

1714
Ship launches